The Danville Otterbots are a summer collegiate baseball team of the Appalachian League. They are located in Danville, Virginia, and play their home games at American Legion Field.

History

Previous Danville teams 
From 1993 to 2020, Danville, Virginia, hosted the Danville Braves. On September 3, 2006, Danville won their first Appalachian League championship, defeating the Elizabethton Twins, two games to one, in a best-of-three series. On September 3, 2009, the Braves won their second Appalachian League championship, again defeating Elizabethton, this time two games to zero.

Collegiate summer team 
In conjunction with a contraction of Minor League Baseball beginning with the 2021 season, the Appalachian League was reorganized as a collegiate summer baseball league, and the Danville Braves were replaced by a new franchise in the revamped league designed for rising college freshmen and sophomores. The new team became known as the Danville Otterbots.

Ballpark sensory room 
In April 2022, the Otterbots held a ribbon cutting ceremony for Luca's Place, their Ballpark Sensory Room. They became the first team in Appalachian League history to have a sensory room inside their gates, joining less than 15 other ballparks across the country with such a feature.

Awards and recognition 
Following the Otterbots' inaugural season, they were named Danville's Favorite Family Fun Spot by Showcase Magazine readers. Following the 2022 season, General Manager Austin Scher was named Appalachian League Executive of the Year.

References

Appalachian League teams
Baseball teams established in 2021
2021 establishments in Virginia
Amateur baseball teams in Virginia
Danville, Virginia